Aston Butterworth was a Formula Two constructor from the United Kingdom, which competed in the seasons  and  when the World Drivers' Championship was run to Formula Two regulations. The team participated in four World Championship Grands Prix.

The project was instigated by Bill Aston, who decided to build a car for Formula Two. The chassis was a copy of a Formula Two Cooper, fitted with a flat-four engine devised by Archie Butterworth. The car made its debut in April 1952 in the Lavant Cup at Goodwood, finishing eighth with Aston at the wheel. In May, a second car was added, driven by Robin Montgomerie-Charrington, who achieved the team's best finish, a third place at Chimay in June. This car was designated NB42 and as of May 2015 was in its original specification.

Aston entered the car, fitted with Allard-Steyr cylinder heads and a new carburettor, in the 1952 German Grand Prix. He withdrew on lap two after losing oil pressure. Aston continued to appear in races throughout the 1953 season, but there was never enough money to develop the program properly. A major problem was the supply of fuel - the Aston Butterworth sometimes had fuel starvation, and sometimes caught on fire.

Complete World Championship results
(key)

References

Formula One constructors
Formula Two constructors
Formula One entrants
British auto racing teams
British racecar constructors
1952 Formula One season cars
1952 establishments in the United Kingdom
1954 disestablishments in the United Kingdom
Auto racing teams established in 1952
Auto racing teams disestablished in 1954